Miss Grand Brazil 2014 was the first edition of the Miss Grand Brazil beauty pageant, held at the Anfiteatro da Casa de Cultura in Olímpia, São Paulo on July 25, 2014. Fourteen candidates competed for the title, of whom the representative of Paraná, Yameme Ibrahim, was named the winner. She then represented Brazil on the parent stage, held on November 1, 2014, in Bangkok, Thailand, where she was placed among the top 20 finalists.

The event featured a traditional performance of the Olímpiense Group of Parafolkloric Dances (GODAP), and was supported by the Municipality of Olímpia, the Municipal Secretariat of Culture, Sport, Tourism, and Leisure led by Gustavo Zanette, as well as Miss Teen Brasil director, Gerson Antonelli, who also served as the Miss Grand Brazil licensee that year.

Background
In early 2014, after Gerson Antonelli took over the franchise of the Miss Grand Brazil contest from the organization chaired by Henrique Fontes, Concurso Nacional de Beleza (CNB Brazil), he collaborated with the Olímpia City Council to organize the first Miss Grand Brazil contest in the city as the special event of the city's annual festival, the National Folklore Festival of Olímpia, on occasion to celebrate the 50th anniversary of the festival, and also to select the country representative for the  contest, which was later held in Thailand that year. The contest was held in parallel with the traditional pageant of the festival, the Concurso da Rainha do Folclore, with the winner received both titles.

The application period for the contest was technically open from June 25 to July 4, however only Olímpia residents with at least high school education were permitted to participate. The pageant's boot camp happened along with the 2014 Folklore Festival, and the grand final night, originally scheduled for July 11, was arranged on July 25.

The organizer also intended to organize an additional contest the following year to select the country representative for the Miss Grand International 2015 pageant, but lost the license to the previous licensee, CNB Brazil.

Results

Contestants
Fourteen contestants competed for the title of Miss Grand Brazil 2014.

  – Gabriella Losacco
  – Ariane Franco
  – Ingrid Franco
  – Fernanda Lemes
  – Fabiola Abad
  – Núbia Gouvêa
  – Cynthia Gomes
  Olímpia – Dayane Kelly
  – Dréssica Alves (Withdrew)
  – Yameme Ibrahim
  – Camila Coutinho
  – Séphora Costa
  – Camila Bornhäusen
  – Naiara Thomé
  – Beatriz Libonatti

References

External links

 

Miss Grand Brazil
Grand Brazil